Swanepoel is an Afrikaans surname, derived from the Dutch Zwaenepoel. Notable people with the surname include:

Candice Swanepoel, South African supermodel
Chris Swanepoel, South African golfer
Corney Swanepoel, New Zealand swimmer
Landi Swanepoel, South African model
Pieter Swanepoel, South African cricketer
Stefan Swanepoel, American business executive
Stephan Swanepoel, Namibian cricketer
Werner Swanepoel, South African rugby player

See also
Swanepoelspoort a mountain pass in South Africa

Afrikaans-language surnames